Miss Universe Colombia is a beauty pageant and an organization conceived in Colombia to select the country's representative to the Miss Universe pageant.

The current titleholder is María Fernanda Aristizábal of Quindío. She represented Colombia at the New Orleans Morial Convention Center in New Orleans, Louisiana, United States on January 14, 2023 placing in Top 16.

History

Titleholders 
The winner of Miss Universe Colombia represents her country at the Miss Universe. On occasion, when the winner does not qualify (due to age) a runner-up is sent.

Titleholders under Miss Universe Colombia org.

Miss Universe Colombia 2020-present

Señorita Colombia 1958-2019

The winner of Señorita Colombia represents her country at Miss Universe. On occasion, when the winner does not qualify (due to age) for either contest, a runner-up is sent. Since 2020, the election of Miss Universe Colombia took over the franchise of Miss Universe in Colombia.

See also
Miss Universe
Miss Colombia
Miss Mundo Colombia
Miss Earth Colombia
Miss Grand Colombia

References

External links
Official website

Colombia
Recurring events established in 2020
Colombian awards
Colombia